Harendra Singh Tewatia is an Indian politician and grandchild of Charan Singh, Prime Minister of India who is serving as a Member of 18th Uttar Pradesh Legislative Assembly from Garhmukteshwar Assembly constituency. In 2022 Uttar Pradesh Legislative Assembly election, he got 1,04,113 votes.

References 

Uttar Pradesh MLAs 2022–2027
Indian politicians
Year of birth missing (living people)
Living people